Constantino Lopes Vaz (born 9 June 1987), simply known as Ballack, is a Cape Verdean footballer who plays as a forward for Portuguese club Real SC.

Football career
Born in Praia, Ballack began his career with CD Barcelona Tarrafal and Sporting Clube da Praia in his native Cape Verde, before arriving at Clube Oriental de Lisboa in Portugal's third tier in 2013. In his first season, the team won promotion to the Segunda Liga as runners-up to S.C. Freamunde. In 2015, he dropped back to the third tier with G.S. Loures, and following a career-best 11 goals he transferred to Sport Benfica e Castelo Branco the following June alongside compatriot teammate Patas Moreno. 

On 27 January 2017, Ballack returned to the second division with C.D. Cova da Piedade. His appearances were limited by injuries as the team from Almada avoided relegation, and in June he signed a one-year contract extension. On 23 July, he scored his first professional goal to equalise as Cova da Piedade won 3–2 against C.D. Nacional in the first round of the Taça da Liga; he received a straight red card in added time. He got his first such league goal on 19 August to wrap up a 3–0 victory against F.C. Arouca, again at the Estádio Municipal José Martins Vieira.

Ballack left Cova da Piedade in July 2019, joining Real S.C. of the third tier.

References

External links
Ballack at Soccerway
Ballack at ForaDeJogo

1987 births
Living people
Association football forwards
Clube Oriental de Lisboa players
Sport Benfica e Castelo Branco players
C.D. Cova da Piedade players
Real S.C. players
Liga Portugal 2 players
Campeonato de Portugal (league) players
Segunda Divisão players
Sportspeople from Praia
Footballers from Santiago, Cape Verde
Cape Verdean footballers
Cape Verdean expatriate footballers
Cape Verdean expatriate sportspeople in Portugal
Expatriate footballers in Portugal